Jam (also Romanized as Jām; also known as Djam) is a village in Howmeh Rural District, in the Central District of Semnan County, Semnan Province, Iran. At the 2006 census, its population was 182, in 56 families.

References 

Populated places in Semnan County